In Protestant Christianity, the relationship between Law and Gospel—God's Law and the Gospel of Jesus Christ—is a major topic in Lutheran and Reformed theology. In these religious traditions, the distinction between the doctrines of Law, which demands obedience to God's ethical will, and Gospel, which promises the forgiveness of sins in light of the person and work of Jesus Christ, is critical. Ministers use it as a hermeneutical principle of biblical interpretation and as a guiding principle in homiletics (sermon composition) and pastoral care. It involves the supersession of the Old Covenant (including traditional Jewish law, or halakha) by the New Covenant and Christian theology.

Other Christian groups have a view on the issue as well, or more generally views of the Old Covenant, though the matter has not usually been as hotly debated or rigorously defined as in the Lutheran and Reformed traditions.

Sometimes the issue is discussed under the headings of "Law and Grace", "Sin and Grace", "Spirit and Letter", and "ministry of death/condemnation" and "ministry of the Spirit/righteousness".

Lutheran view

Martin Luther and Lutheran theologians
A specific formulation of the distinction of Law and Gospel was first brought to the attention of the Christian Church by Martin Luther (1483–1546), and laid down as the foundation of evangelical Lutheran biblical exegesis and exposition in Article 4 of the Apology of the Augsburg Confession (1531): "All Scripture ought to be distributed into these two principal topics, the Law and the promises. For in some places it presents the Law, and in others the promise concerning Christ, namely, either when [in the Old Testament] it promises that Christ will come, and offers, for His sake, the remission of sins, justification, and life eternal, or when, in the Gospel [in the New Testament], Christ Himself, since He has appeared, promises the remission of sins, justification, and life eternal.". The Formula of Concord likewise affirmed this distinction in Article V, where it states: "We believe, teach, and confess that the distinction between the Law and the Gospel is to be maintained in the Church with great diligence..."

Martin Luther wrote: "Hence, whoever knows well this art of distinguishing between Law and Gospel, him place at the head and call him a doctor of Holy Scripture." Throughout the Lutheran Age of Orthodoxy (1580–1713) this hermeneutical discipline was considered foundational and important by Lutheran theologians.

This distinction was the first article in Patrick`s Places (1528) by Patrick Hamilton.

Carl Ferdinand Wilhelm Walther (1811–1887), who was the first (and third) president of the Lutheran Church–Missouri Synod, renewed interest in and attention to this theological skill in his evening lectures at Concordia Seminary, St. Louis 1884–85.

Book of Concord
The Formula of Concord distinguished three uses, or purposes, in the Law in Article VI. It states: "[T]he Law was given to men for three reasons ..."

that "thereby outward discipline might be maintained against wild, disobedient men [and that wild and intractable men might be restrained, as though by certain bars]"
that "men thereby may be led to the knowledge of their sins"
that "after they are regenerate ... they might ... have a fixed rule according to which they are to regulate and direct their whole life"

The primary concern was to maintain that the Law should continue to be used by Christians after they had been regenerated by the Holy Spirit through the Gospel to counter the doctrine of Johannes Agricola, who taught that the Law was no longer needed by regenerate Christians." Confessional Lutheranism teaches that the Law cannot be used to deny the Gospel, neither can the Gospel be used to deny God's Law.

The three uses of the Law are:

Curb -  Through fear of punishment, the Law keeps the sinful nature of both Christians and non-Christians under check. This does not stop sin, since the sin is already committed when the heart desires to do what is wrong, yet it does stop the open outbreak of sin that will do even further damage.
Mirror - The Law serves as a perfect reflection of what God created the human heart and life to be. It shows anyone who compares his/her life to God's requirement for perfection that he/she is sinful.
Guide - This use of the law that applies only to Christians. The law becomes the believer's helper. Empowered by the gospel truth of forgiveness and righteousness in Christ, the believer's new self eagerly desires to live to please the Triune God.

Reformed view

The distinction between law and gospel is a standard formulation in Reformed theology, though in recent years some have characterized it as distinctively Lutheran. Zacharias Ursinus sharply distinguished the law and gospel as "the chief and general divisions of the holy scriptures" in his commentary on the Heidelberg Catechism. Louis Berkhof called the law and the gospel "the two parts of the Word of God as a means of grace," since law and Gospel are found in both testaments.

In his 1536 book Institutes of the Christian Religion, the Reformer John Calvin distinguished three uses in the Law. Calvin wrote the following: "[T]o make the whole matter clearer, let us survey briefly the function and use of what is called the 'moral law.' Now, so far as I understand it, it consists of three parts."

 "[W]hile it shows God's righteousness . . . , it warns, informs, convicts, and lastly condemns, every man of his own unrighteousness" (2.7.6).
 It functions "by fear of punishment to restrain certain men who are untouched by any care for what is just and right unless compelled by hearing the dire threats in the law" (2.7.10).
 "It admonishes believers and urges them on in well-doing" (2.7.12-13).

This scheme is the same as the Formula of Concord, with the exception that the first and second uses are switched.

In later Reformed scholasticism the order is the same as for Lutherans. The three uses are called:

 The usus politicus sive civilis, the political or civil use, is a restraint on sin and stands apart from the work of salvation. It is part of God's general revelation or common grace for unbelievers as well as believers.
 The usus elenchticus sive paedagogicus, the elenctical or pedagogical use which confronts sin and points us to Christ.
 The usus didacticus sive normativus, the didactic use, which is solely for believers, teaching the way of righteousness.

The Heidelberg Catechism, in explaining the third use of the Law, teaches that the moral law as contained in the Ten Commandments is binding for Christians and that it instructs Christians how to live in service to God in gratitude for His grace shown in redeeming mankind. John Calvin deemed this third use of the Law as its primary use.

Lutheran and Reformed differences
Scholastic Lutheran and Reformed theologians differed primarily on the way in which the third use of the law functions for believers. The Reformed emphasized the third use (tertius usus legis) because the redeemed are expected to bear good works. Some Lutherans saw here the danger of works-righteousness, and argued that the third use should always return believers to the second use and again to Christ rather than being the ultimate norm.

Additionally, some have suggested that the third use of the law is not found at all in Luther but comes from Philip Melanchthon. Although some Lutherans have rejected that view, it has caused others to dispute the validity of the "third use" of the Law entirely. Paul Althaus, for instance, writes in his treatise on Law and Gospel: "This [ethical] guidance by the Holy Spirit implies that God's concrete commanding cannot be read off from a written document, an inherited scheme of law. I must learn afresh every day what God wants of me. For God's commanding has a special character for each individual: it is always contemporary, always new. God commands me (and each person) in a particular way, in a different way than He commands others.... The living and spiritual character of the knowledge of what God requires of men in the present moment must not be destroyed by rules and regulations." Such theologians believe the third use leads to or encourages a form of legalism and is possibly an implicit denial of sola fide. Conversely, Reformed Christians have sometimes seen this two-use scheme of some modern Lutherans as leading to a form of antinomianism.

Some believe that "for Luther the pedagogic use of the Law was primary, while for Calvin this third or didactic use was the principal one; yet [historically] both the Lutheran and the Reformed traditions maintain the threefold conceptualization."

Methodist view
John Wesley admonished Methodist preachers to emphasize both the Law and the Gospel:

Methodism makes a distinction between the ceremonial law and the moral law that is the Ten Commandments given to Moses. In Methodist Christianity, the moral law is the "fundamental ontological principle of the universe" and "is grounded in eternity", being "engraved on human hearts by the finger of God." In contradistinction to the teaching of the Lutheran Churches, the Methodist Churches bring the Law and the Gospel together in a profound sense: "the law is grace and through it we discover the good news of the way life is intended to be lived." John Wesley, the father of the Methodist tradition taught:

Imperative and indicative
Certain recurring grammatical patterns in the Old Testament and in the New involving the sequencing of imperative and indicative predicates are taken by theologians as central to the relationship between Law and Gospel. Daniel Defoe discusses three pairs of these predicates in his second and final sequel to Robinson Crusoe, Serious Reflections (1720): "forbear and live", "do and live", "believe and live". According to Defoe, the first was established with Adam in paradise, the second as the Law with the children of Israel, and the third as the Gospel of Jesus Christ

However Luther viewed all imperative commands as law, even the command to believe the Gospel. In The Bondage of the Will he writes,

"[T]he commands exist to show, not our moral ability, but our inability. This includes God's command of all men everywhere to repent and believe the gospel, an impossible act of will apart from a supernatural work of the Holy Spirit uniting us to Christ .." p. 149

See also

Antinomianism
Calvinism
Christian views on the Old Covenant
Doctrine of the two kingdoms
Expounding of the Law
Great Commission
Joint Declaration on the Doctrine of Justification
Legalism
Lutheranism
Theonomy
Abrogation of Old Covenant laws

Notes

Further reading
Lutheran
Althaus, Paul. The Divine Command: a New Perspective on Law and Gospel. Trans. Franklin Sherman. Philadelphia: Fortress Press, 1966.
Bente, F. and Dau, W.H.T., eds. and trans. Triglot Concordia: The Symbolical Books of the Evangelical Lutheran Church. St. Louis: Concordia Publishing House, 1921. BookofConcord.org
Elert, Werner. Law and Gospel. Trans. Edward H. Schroeder. Philadelphia: Fortress Press, 1967.
Walther. C. F. W. The Proper Distinction Between Law and Gospel. St. Louis, MO: Concordia Publishing House. 1986.

Reformed
Bahnsen, Greg L. Theonomy in Christian Ethics. S.L.: Covenant Media Press, 2002.
Barth, Karl. "Gospel and Law" in Community, State and Church: Three Essays. Will Herberg, ed. New York: Doubleday Anchor Books, 1960.
Calvin, John. "The Law Given, Not to Retain a People for Itself, but to Keep Alive the Hope of Salvation in Christ Until His Advent" Institutes of the Christian Religion, Bk 2, Section 7. 
Clark, R. Scott. "Retaining the Law Gospel Distinction" 
Gundry, Stanley N., ed. Five Views on Law and Gospel. Grand Rapids, MI: Zondervan, 1996.
Horton, Michael S. "Calvin on Law and Gospel," Westminster Seminary California 
Murray, John. Principles of Conduct: Aspects of Biblical Ethics. Grand Rapids, MI: Eerdmans, 1957.

Lutherans and Reformed in Dialogue
Linebaugh, Jonathan. God’s Two Words: Law and Gospel in Lutheran and Reformed Traditions. Grand Rapids, MI: Eerdmans, 2018.

External links

Law in Luther And Calvin, by Edward A. Dowey
The Struggle to Balance Law & Grace, by Bernie L. Gillespie
The Christian and the Moral Law - Link list at the-highway.com

Lutheran
 Hummel, Horace D. "Are Law and Gospel a Valid Hermeneutical Principle?" [online] Concordia Theological Quarterly 46 (1982) no. 2-3:181-207. Available from CTSFW.edu
 Klug, Eugene F. "Confessional Emphasis on Law and Gospel for Our Day" [online] Concordia Theological Quarterly 42 (1978) no. 3:241-257. Available from CTSFW.edu
 Lueker, Erwin L. Law and Gospel from the Christian Cyclopedia. Concordia Publishing House, 2000.
Rosenthal, Shane Law & Gospel.
Using the Third Use: Formula of Concord VI and the Preacher's Task
Walther, C. F. W. Law and Gospel, (excerpts).
Walther, C. F. W. The Proper Distinction between Law and Gospel, (complete work).
Walther, C. F. W. The Proper Distinction between Law and Gospel at LibriVox (public domain audiobooks)
Bucholtz, Jon D. '"Justification: Handling the Word of Truth, part 3 of 5." Forward in Christ, April 2006. WELS publication, Accessed April 17, 2006.
Scholarly articles on Law and Gospel from the Wisconsin Lutheran Seminary Library

Reformed (Calvinist)
"Law and Grace", sermon by C. H. Spurgeon
"God's Law in Man's Heart", sermon by C. H. Spurgeon
"Law and Grace" by John Murray
"Calvin & The Law-Gospel Hermeneutic" by Michael Horton
"What's Really at Stake?", by Michael Horton
"Calvin’s Third Use of the Law: An Assessment of Reformed Explications of the Ten Commandments" by John P. Burgess in PDF
"Michael Horton, John Calvin, and 'Law & Gospel'", by Bill DeJong
"Mixing 'Law' and Gospel in the Abrahamic Promise", by Mark Horne
Law and Liberty, Law and Gospel extensive link list at monergism.com

Methodist (Wesleyan-Arminian)
My Church Is Really Strict — Isn’t That Legalism?, by Nathan Purdy

Lutheran theology
Calvinist theology
Christian terminology
Philosophy of law
Mosaic law in Christian theology